Rodrigo Moura Torres (born 29 March 1977) is a Portuguese dressage rider. He competed at the 2019 FEI European Championships, and competed for the Portuguese team at the 2020 Tokyo Olympics, finished 16th in the individual final and 8th with the Portuguese Team.

Career
Rodrigo Torres began riding at age three at his family's farm in Alter do Chão. The farm has been in the family since the 1800s. Torres started competing at international level in 2012. His higher level breakthrough however began in 2017, when he started campaigning Lusitano-bred Fogoso. Torres and Fogoso were named reserve for the Portuguese team for the 2018 World Equestrian Games, but when a spot opened up Torres declined to go as he felt Fogoso was too young at age eight.

In 2019, Torres and Fogoso made their championships debut at the 2019 Europeans in Rotterdam. Torres placed 24th individually, and in the process helped Portugal achieve a team qualification for the 2020 Summer Olympics. Later that year, Torres won gold during the National Championships in Lisbon.

In 2021, Torres and Fogoso got officially named to represent Portugal at the delayed Tokyo Olympic Games. In Tokyo he made it to the Individual final where he finished 16th.

Personal life
Torres is married to Portuguese Dressage rider Maria Pais do Amaral. He runs the Coudelaria Torres Vaz Freire stud farm in Alter do Chão with his wife and father Carlos. Rodrigo Torres has also a daughter.

Programs

References

External links
 

Living people
1977 births
People from Portalegre, Portugal
Portuguese male equestrians
Portuguese dressage riders
Equestrians at the 2020 Summer Olympics
Olympic equestrians of Portugal
Sportspeople from Portalegre District